Metal production, in particular iron and steel industry, is the dominant heavy industry in Ukraine. Ukraine is the world's eighth largest producer and third largest exporter of iron and steel (2007). Ukrainian iron and steel industry accounts for around 2% of worldwide crude steel output, 5% to 6% of the national gross domestic product and 34% of Ukrainian export revenue (2007 data). In 2007 it employed 420,000 people – 10% of industrial labor and 2% of the total workforce. It has the highest, by a wide margin, revealed comparative advantage of all branches of the Ukrainian economy. The industry peaked at 42.8 million tonnes in 2007 but has been gravely affected by the financial crisis of 2007–2010 and declined to 29.8 million tonnes in 2009.

Ukraine possesses substantial natural reserves of iron ore. Ore mining exceeds the demands of domestic steel mills, but export potential is weakened by high extraction costs. The Ukrainian iron and steel industry is concentrated in central (Dnipro, Kryvyi Rih, Nikopol), southern (Zaporizhia) and eastern (Donets Basin, Mariupol) regions of Ukraine. There are 14 iron ore mining companies, 15 iron and steel mills, and three ferroalloy plants. Most of iron and steel is produced by large mills with annual capacity of between 4 and 7 million tonnes. As of 2006, 44.6% of Ukrainian steel was produced in obsolescent open hearth furnaces; modernization of plant and coping with rising energy costs are the main challenges to the future of Ukrainian steel. The Ukrainian steel industry has been privatized since the 1990s but the coal mines are still owned by the government and experience chronic financial problems.

Ukraine is also a significant producer of manganese, manganese ore and manganese ferroalloys and has 75% of the ore reserves of the former CIS. The aluminium industry concentrates in Mykolaiv and Zaporizhia but is limited by energy availability and costs. Ukrainian production of uranium in the Dnipropetrovsk Oblast provides only 30% of domestic demand.

History

Copper Age 

Metal production in Ukraine developed along the same lines as that of it near neighbours. The Stone Age and Copper Age boundary was unclear as most peoples retained Stone Age tools and used them alongside Copper Age tools.

The Trypilian culture began in East Ukraine and existed from 5400 to 2000 BC. It is named after a site in the Kiev (Kyiv) region near Trypilia uncovered by Vikentiy Khvoyka in 1898. In the West of Ukraine the Sredny Stog culture (4500-3500 BC) was the main influence along with the Catacomb culture (2800-2200 BC) and it is during these times that we see the earliest examples of copper technology in the form of fishing hooks and other implements around 2500 BC.

Bronze Age

Iron Age 
During the Iron Age, there were several influences on metallurgy: the Dacians, Cimmerians, Scythians, Sarmatians, among other nomadic peoples. The Scythian Kingdom existed here from 750 BC to 250 BC.

Ancient period 
The ancient Greek colonies founded in the 6th century BC on the north-eastern shore of the Black Sea, the colonies of Tyras, Olbia, Hermonassa, continued as Roman and Byzantine cities until the 6th century AD.

Middle Ages

Early Modern

19th and 20th centuries 

In 1868, the Millwall Iron Works Company received an order from the Imperial Russian Government for the plating of a naval fortress being built at Kronstadt on the Baltic Sea. Hughes accepted a concession from the Imperial Russian Government to develop metal works in the region, and in 1869 acquired a piece of land to the north of the Azov Sea from Russian statesman Sergei Kochubey (son of Viktor Kochubey).

He formed the 'New Russia Company Ltd.' to raise capital, and in the summer of 1870, at the age of 55, he moved to the Russian Empire. He sailed with eight ships, with not only all the equipment necessary to establish a metal works, but also much of the skilled labour; a group of about a hundred ironworkers and miners mostly from South Wales.

He immediately started to build metal works close to the river Kalmius, at a site near the village of Alexandrovka. The state-of-the-art works had eight blast furnaces and was capable of a full production cycle, with the first pig iron cast in 1872. During the 1870s, collieries and iron ore mines were sunk, and brickworks and other facilities were established to make the isolated works a self-sufficient industrial complex. He further built a railway-line-producing factory. All of Hughes' facilities were held under the 'Novorussian society for coal, iron and rails production.'

The Hughes factory gave its name to the settlement which grew in its shadow, and the town of Hughesovka (Yuzovka) grew rapidly. Hughes personally provided a hospital, schools, bath houses, tea rooms, a fire brigade and an Anglican church dedicated to the patron saints St George and St David. The land around the metal works quickly grew to become an industrial and cultural centre in the region; the population of the city founded by Hughes now exceeds 1 million.

Over the next twenty years, the works prospered and expanded, first under John Hughes and then, after his death in 1889, under the management of four of his sons. Amazingly, John Hughes was only semi-literate - he was unable to write and could only read capital letters

Natural resources 

{|class="wikitable" style="float: right"
! colspan=6 | Mining of principal raw commodities, thousand metric tonnes<ref name=T2007>[http://minerals.usgs.gov/minerals/pubs/country/2007/myb3-2007-up.xls USGS tables accompanying The Mineral Industry of Ukraine 2007] (MS Excel). 2007 Mineral Yearbook. United States Geological Survey.</ref>
|-
| align="center" style="background:#f0f0f0;"|Commodity
| align="center" style="background:#f0f0f0;"|2003
| align="center" style="background:#f0f0f0;"|2004
| align="center" style="background:#f0f0f0;"|2005
| align="center" style="background:#f0f0f0;"|2006
| align="center" style="background:#f0f0f0;"|2007
|-
| Alumina|| 1,434 || 1,562 || 1,632 || 1,672 || 1,700
|-
| Anthracite || 14,427 || 18,295 || 16,204 || 13,444 || 13,000
|-
| Bituminous coal|| 63,866 || 62,100 || 58,000 || 66,600 || 62,255
|-
| Iron ore (pure Fe content)|| 34,300 || 36,000 || 37,700 || 40,700 || 42,800
|-
| Manganese ore (pure Mn content)|| 880 || 810 || 770 || 546 || 580
|-
| Titanium ores (pure Ti content)|| 314 || 283 || 286 || 344 || 362
|-
|}

Ukraine possesses world's largest reserves of commercial-grade iron ore - 30 billion tonnes of ore or around one-fifth of the global total. Adjusting for pure iron content the Ukrainian reserves (9 billion tonnes of iron, 11.6% of the global total) are the world's third largest after Russia and Australia. Iron ore mining is concentrated in Kryvyi Rih Ore Basin and 80% of it is controlled by the Ukrrudprom. Open-pit mining companies are capable of extracting 90 million tonnes annually whilst underground mining contributes another 18.5 million. Actual ore extraction, according to the United States Geological Survey, peaked in 2007 at 77.9 million tonnes of ore (42.8 million tonnes of pure iron content).

Ukrainian reserves of hard coals are concentrated in the Donets Basin. More than two hundred coal mines of Donbass account for 90% of Ukrainian coal output; the balance comes from 18 mines in Lviv Oblast and Volyn Oblast. Metallurgical-grade coals account for 54% of national coal reserves. In the 2000s the mix of Ukrainian coal output shifted in favor of energy coals and the steel mills compensated for the deficit of metallurgical coals with imports of coke from Russia (7 million tonnes in 2007) and other countries. Coal mining in Donbass is in continuous financial distress: the majority of coal mines, owned by the government, operate at a loss and require regular financial aid. Labor productivity in the Ukrainian coal industry is three to eight times lower than in Russia, Central Europe and the United States.

Economically viable manganese reserves in Ukraine are estimated at 140 million tons, or one-quarter of world's reserves (2010 data). They are spread over the Nikopol manganese basin which spans across Dnipro, Kherson and the Zaporizhia regions on both sides of the Dnieper River. There are also three lesser manganese ore provinces which are not used commercially – Kerch, Burshtyn and Haivoron. Total reserve base of 520 million tons stands at 10% of the global reserve base which is dominated by South African resources (2008 data).

Ukrainian underground uranium and thorium mines are located in the Kirovohrad Oblast and are depleted by 50 to 60%. Their output, refined at the VostGOK plant in Zhovti Vody, meets only around 30% of national demand (2007 data). Ukraine has developed an ambitious program to expand uranium mining and production starting with the development of the Novokonstantinovskoye field.

Ukraine also possesses substantial reserves of scandium (as a byproduct of iron ore processing), titanium (as both ilmenite and rutile), zirconium and mercury. Mercury mining and processing by the Nikitovka Mines in Horlivka ceased in 1991 and the mine equipment has been partially converted for fluorescent lamp recycling. Emission of mercury from burning high-mercury Horlivka coals remains an environmental hazard.

 Iron and steel industry 

In 2000-2007 ferrous metallurgy expanded owing to a global rise in demand and prices. In 2007 crude steel production peaked at 42.8 million tonnes. 78% of it was exported—mostly to Italy, Russia and Turkey. Primary pig iron and secondary steel production is dominated by seven large steel mills with an annual capacity of 4 to 7 million tonnes. The industry has seen a pattern of consolidation into vertically-integrated companies and their ownership changes with continuing mergers and acquisitions. Key players are Kryvorizhstal (ArcelorMittal), Evraz, the Industrial Union of Donbas, Midland Group, Privat Group and Metinvest (SCM Holdings).

Non-ferrous metals
Ukrainian manganese industry is controlled by Privat Group. Primary manganese smelting concentrates in the towns of Marhanets and Pokrov. Secondary manufacturing of ferroalloys and silicomanganese is spread between Nikopol Ferroalloy Plant, controlled by Interros, and lesser plants in Zaporizhia, Stakhanov, Kostyantynivka, Kramatorsk controlled by Privat. Total production of ferroalloys in 2007 reached 2 million tonnes.

Ukrainian aluminium industry consists of an alumina refining plant in Mykolaiv and the ZALK aluminium smelting plant in Zaporizhia, which is controlled by RUSAL. Annual capacity is estimated in excess of 1 million tonnes of refined alumina. Only a fraction of it is processed domestically, with a fairly constant production of 0.11 million tonnes of primary aluminium (2003–2007), or 0.3% of global output. Development and the very existence of aluminium smelting depends on securing sources of affordable energy. In 2007 ZALK coped with a 24% increase in electricity prices; in 2008 it faced a 45% price increase and shut down some of its electrolytic smelters.

 Ukrainian metallurgical companies 

Notes

References

 John Hughes (businessman)
 Emerson, Michael (2006). The prospect of deep free trade between the European Union and Ukraine. Brussels: Centre for European Policy Studies. .
 Harris, James R. (1999). The Great Urals: regionalism and the evolution of the Soviet system. Cornell University Press. .
 Levine, R. M.; Brininstool, M.; Wallace, G. L. (2010). The Mineral Industry of Ukraine, in: 2007 Mineral Yearbook (advance release). United States Geological Survey.
 McKay, John P. (1970). Pioneers for profit; foreign entrepreneurship and Russian industrialization, 1885-1913. University of Chicago Press. .
 OECD (2007). OECD Economic Surveys: Ukraine 2007. OECD Publishing. .
 Oxford Business Group (2007). The Report: Emerging Ukraine 2007. Oxford Business Group. .
 Oxford Business Group (2008). The Report Ukraine 2008. Oxford Business Group. .
 Rudnytsky, Stepan (1918). Ukraine, the Land and Its People: An Introduction to Its Geography. New York City. 2009 reprint: Bibliobazaar LLC, .
 Seigelbaum, Lewis and Walkowitz, Daniel (1995). Workers of the Donbass speak: survival and identity in the new Ukraine, 1989. SUNY Press. .
 Subbotin, A. (2005). Radioactive dust pollution around the dumps of the uranium deposit, in: Proceedings of the International Workshop in Geoenvironment and Geotechnics (GEOENV 2005): 12–14 September 2005, Milos Conference Center, George Eliopoulos, Milos Greece. Heliotopos Conferences. .
 Swain, Adam (2007). Re-constructing the post-Soviet industrial region: the Donbas in transition. Routledge. .
 USGS (2010). Mineral Commodity Summaries 2010 (MCS-2010). United States Geological Survey. .
 USGS (2008). Mineral Commodity Summaries 2008 (MCS-2008)''. United States Geological Survey. .

Economy of Ukraine
Metallurgical industry of Ukraine